Antonio Guzmán Capel (born January 19, 1960) is a Spanish painter. Since 1961 he has resided in the city of Palencia, Spain. He had been considered a child prodigy.

Biography
Capel is a self-taught artist. From childhood he showed an innate qualities for drawing and painting. He made his first exhibition when he was only eleven years old. Thereafter, each year he held another exhibition. At fourteen years of age, he exhibited his work in Switzerland, where he was regarded by local critics as a genius of painting, because as stated, there was no known artist at that time with the ability to perform works such as that, at such an early age.

Exhibitions
 1971 His first exhibition in the Palencia's Tourism Office, Palencia
 1974 Moves Gallery, Fribourg, Switzerland
 1979 Tingad Gallery, Salamanca
 1980 Ajuria Gallery, Palencia
 1982 Rua 2 Gallery, Burgos ----- Doctor's Association Gallery, Cáceres
 1984 Fine Arts Gallery, Gijón ----- Guest in “Salon de les Nations”, Paris
 1985 Duran Gallery, Madrid ----- Toscana Gallery, Valencia.
 1986 Caja Postal, Cuenca, Toledo, San Lorenzo Del Escorial
 1988 Group Exhibition in Towers Gallery, Bilbao
 1989 Group Exhibition in Renoir Room, Zaragoza ----- Centro-Arte Gallery, León
 1990 Art International Gallery, Bilbao
 1992 Caja España, Palencia
 1995 Group Exhibition in Towers Gallery, Bilbao
 1996 Arte Sur, International Fair of the Contemporary Art, Granada ----- Martín Brezmes Gallery, Zamora ----- Juan Larrea Gallery, Bilbao
 1997 First International Fair of the Contemporary Art of C. y L., Salamanca ----- Mar Gallery, Barcelona ----- C. J. Art Gallery, Valladolid ----- Ercilla Gallery, Bilbao
 1999 Caja Cantabria, Santander ----- Caja España, Palencia
 2000 Arte Sevilla 2000, Seville ----- Arte Santander, Santander ----- artexpo, Las Vegas (Nevada) USA ----- Group Exhibition in San Diego, USA ----- 25 years of Contemporary Art, Diaz Caneja Foundation, Palencia
 2003 Tribute to Claudio Prieto, Diaz Caneja Foundation, Palencia ----- Restauro Van Dick Gallery, Madrid
 2004 Caja España, Palencia ----- BBVA Gallery, Valladolidd
 2006 Sharon Art Gallery, León
 2008 Sharon Art Gallery, León
 2009 Global Art Gallery, Barcelona ----- Caja España, Palencia
 2010 Exposición colectiva enla Sala Mauro Muriedas de Torrelavega, verano 2010 ----- Ayuda a "Hombres Nuevos", Obispo Nicolás Castellanos, Caja Duero, PALENCIA ----- Colección del Ayuntamiento de Palencia Fundación Díaz Caneja
 2011 Fundación Isabel Frontela, PALENCIA
 2012 Feria de Arte de Bolzano, del 16 al 18 marzo, ITALIA ----- Galería Javier Román, MÁLAGA
 2013 Factory-Art Gallery, Berlín, ALEMANIA. Cibeles Place, Mail Room, MADRID 2013

Awards and honors
 1974 1st National Prize "City of Ceuta" ----- Honourable mention in the Prize of Painting "Ejército", Madrid
 1975 1st Prize “Pintura Jóven” Guardo, Palencia
 1976 Honourable mention in the II National Biennial of Huesca ----- Finalist in Art Sport 76, Bilbao
 1977 2nd Prize in Medina del Campo, Valladolid ----- 2nd Prize in the Caja de Ahorros Provincial of Valladolid
 1978 Special Honourable mention in Pego, Alicante
 1979 Accesit Painting Competition "Rafael Zabaleta", JAÉN -----1st Prize in XXX Puertollano's Gallery, Ciudad Real  -----Honourable mention in the II Competition "Rioja", Logroño -----1st Prize "Ciudad de Benicarló", Castellón
 1980 2nd Prize in the I National Young Competition "Amadis Gallery", Madrid -----1st Prize in Barbastro, Huesca -----1st Prize in Aranda de Duero Burgos -----1st Prize "García Gongora", Ateneo de Almeria -----Finalist in the V Biennial "Provincia de Leon"
 1981 1st Prize in Mora. Toledo ----- 2nd Prize in Rota, Cadiz
 1982 1st Prize in Martos, Jaen  ----- Silver award in Córdoba
 1983 Special Mention of Painting in the “Salon d´hiver” Avignon, France ----- Painting grant given by the Provincial Delegation of Palencia  ----- 2nd Prize National Painting Competition in Campo de Criptana, Ciudad Real ----- 1st Prize in Yecla, Murcia
 1985 1st Prize in the IV Painting Competition in Melilla ----- 3rd Prize in IV Jaén Painting Competition (Club "63"), JAÉN ----- 1st Prize "Ciudad de Murcia" in Cartagena.
 1987 Honorary accésit IV Painting Competition "Ciudad de Miranda de Ebro", Burgos
 1988 1st Accésit in the XV National Painting Competition of Teruel
 1989 Popular Prize in the 1st fast Painting Competition in "El Retiro", Madrid
 1996 LVII National Exhibition of Plastic Arts in Valdepeñas, Ciudad Real
 1997 1st Prize in Ciudad Rodrigo, Salamanca
 1998 Silver medal Townhall of San Juan, Alicante
 2001 Finalist "Señorío de Berrtiz", Pamplona
 2002 Finalist Toresma 2, Madrid ----- 1st Mention of Honor “Premio Ejército del Aire”, Madrid
 2003 1st Prize of Painting Toresma, Madrid ----- Mention of Honor “Premio Ejército del Aire”, Madrid
 2004 1st Prize “Cartel taurino de San Antolín”, Palencia
 2005 1st Prize “Cartel taurino feria de León” ----- 2nd Prize “Premio Ejército del Aire”, Madrid
 2006 Mention of Honor “Premio Ejército del Aire”, Madrid ----- Work entitled "Gitanillos" for the movie Guillermo Fesser, "Candida".
 2009 Portrait of Brother Rafael (Rafael Arnáiz Barón), for his canonization in Vatican City on 11/10/09 ----- Poster announcing Davis Cup, Murcia
 2010 Cry bullfighting posters for parties of Ciudad Real 2010
 2011 Portrait of Catherine Lacoste and Angel Piñero
 2012 Portrait of Cayetana Fitz-James Stuart, Duchess of Alba ----- Course and Conference on Psychology University Model   of Mérida, Yucatán, Mexico

Pictures in museums
 Contemporary Art Museum Madrid.
 Contemporary Art Museum Leon.
 Contemporary Art Museum. Ayllón, Segovia.
 Provincial museum of Ceuta.
 Museo de los tiros, Granada.
 Museo de Campo de Criptana, Ciudad Real

Particular art galleries
 Caja de Ahorros Provincial de Valladolid
 Caja España, Palencia
 Ecuador
 San Diego (USA)
 Las Vegas (USA)
 Washington (USA)
 Puerto La Cruz and Caracas, Venezuela
 Fribourg, Switzerland
 Guatemala, Paris, Ireland, Hong Kong..., others in Spain

Bibliography
 Spanish art, 1979–93
 Diart 1981
 Peliart 1977, 1981
 Provincial savings bank of Valladolid Memory 1978
 Batik 1981
 National aids of Painting and Sculpture. Mª Teresa Cocaine Valladolid 1981
 Arteder 82 It shows the Graphical Work International Bilbao 1982
 Arteguuia Special monographic dedicated to Palencia 1989
 CAPEL, by Jose Maria Esparta 1990
 Arteguia 1992-93
 Anuari D'Art Grup Escolà 1996-97
 I Fair the International of Contemporary Art of Castile and León Arcale 1997
 Tribute 16 artists surroundings to Santiago Amon. Prov Delegation Palencia
 Tourist Palencia 1997
 Art 21 Fertile valleys 2000
 25 Years of Contemporary Art Palencia, 1975–2000
 Toresma-2 April 2002
 4th History of the THAT (Publishing ECIR)
 Cossio 2006

References

External links
 
 Capel's Cat Paintings

1960 births
Living people
People from Tétouan
20th-century Spanish painters
20th-century Spanish male artists
Spanish male painters
21st-century Spanish painters
Realist painters
21st-century Spanish male artists